The Oxford Model or the Oxford macro econometric Model was created by Lawrence Klein and  Sir James Ball.  It included a Phillips-type relation and led to an "explosion" of macroeconometric forecasting.

References

Formal sciences
Econometric models